The women's 1500 metre freestyle event at the 2020 Summer Olympics was held in 2021 at the Tokyo Aquatics Centre. These Games marked the first time to feature women swimming in the pool longer than 800 metres.

The medals for the competition were presented by David Haggerty, United States; IOC Member, and the medalists' bouquets were presented by Dale Neuburger, United States; FINA Treasurer.

Records
Prior to this competition, the existing world and Olympic records were as follows.

The following records were established during the competition:

Qualification

The Olympic Qualifying Time for the event is 16:32.04. Up to two swimmers per National Olympic Committee (NOC) can automatically qualify by swimming that time at an approved qualification event. The Olympic Selection Time is 17:01.80. Up to one swimmer per NOC meeting that time is eligible for selection, allocated by world ranking until the maximum quota for all swimming events is reached. NOCs without a female swimmer qualified in any event can also use their universality place.

Competition format

The competition consists of two rounds: heats and a final. The swimmers with the best 8 times in the heats advance to the final. Swim-offs are used as necessary to break ties for advancement to the next round.

Schedule
All times are Japan Standard Time (UTC+9)

Results

Heats
The swimmers with the top 8 times, regardless of heat, advance to the final.

Final

References

Women's 01500 metre freestyle
Olympics
Women's events at the 2020 Summer Olympics
2021 in women's swimming